Group 5 of the UEFA Euro 1968 qualifying tournament was one of the eight groups to decide which teams would qualify for the UEFA Euro 1968 finals tournament. Group 5 consisted of four teams: Hungary, East Germany, Netherlands, and Denmark, where they played against each other home-and-away in a round-robin format. The group winners were Hungary, who finished 2 points above East Germany.

Final table

Matches

Goalscorers

References
 
 
 

Group 1
1966–67 in Hungarian football
1967–68 in Hungarian football
1966–67 in East German football
1967–68 in East German football
1966–67 in Dutch football
1967–68 in Dutch football
1966 in Danish football
1967 in Danish football